The Five Cents of Lavarede (French: Les cinq sous de Lavarède) is a 1939 French comedy adventure film directed by Maurice Cammage and starring Fernandel, Josette Day and Andrex. It is based on the eponymous 1894 novel by Paul d'Ivoi and Henri Chabrillat.

Plot

In order to claim an inheritance, a young man must travel all the way around the world with only five centime in his pocket.

Cast

 Fernandel as Armand Lavarède  
 Josette Day as Miss Aurett Murlington  
 Andrex as Jim Strong  
 Félix Oudart as Le capitaine du cargo Heaven Way  
 André Roanne as Jim Strong  
 Henri Nassiet as Jack  
 Pierre Labry as Le gardien chef  
 Albert Duvaleix as Maître Panabert  
 Geymond Vital as Le policier  
 Jacques Henley as L'officier du Normandie  
  as Le commissaire de bord
 Talmont as Le révérend Houston  
 Serjius as Un gardien  
 Jacques Servières as Le pilote  
  as Le barman  
 Paul Grail as César Bouffigues, l'agent marseillais  
 Paul Bonifas as Un marin  
 Alexandre Mihalesco as Le commissaire-priseur hindou  
 Philippe Janvier as Le conspirateur  
  as Le reporter  
 Jacqueline Figus as La danseuse acrobatique  
 Jeanne Fusier-Gir as La princesse Djali  
 Mady Berry as Mme Benoît, la concierge  
 Jean Témerson as Tartinovitch  
 Jean Dax as Sir Murlington  
 Marcel Vallée as Bouvreuil 
 Georges Marceau as L'exécuteur  
  
 Chukry-Bey as Bit part  
 Hugues de Bagratide as Le ministre hindou 
 Ratna Moerindiah as Une danseuse hindoue  
 
 Frédéric O'Brady

In popular culture

The same year the film premiered it was also adapted into a text comic by French artist Pellos.

References

Bibliography 
 Goble, Alan. The Complete Index to Literary Sources in Film. Walter de Gruyter, 1999.

External links 
 

1939 films
1930s French-language films
Films directed by Maurice Cammage
Films based on French novels
Films adapted into comics
French black-and-white films
Films scored by Casimir Oberfeld
French adventure comedy films
1930s adventure comedy films
1939 comedy films
1930s French films